Goofy Goat is a 1931 animated short film produced by Ted Eshbaugh Studios.

Plot 
The goat is driving his car, which is stuck in a traffic jam behind a fat pig. Goofy manages to make it to the Glee Club, where he and his friends put on a little show.

Trivia 
The film was banned by many theatres because of the scene where the pig exclaims "damn!" after the goat passes him.
This film is said to be among the first color cartoons made, however only a black-and-white version survives.

References 

American animated short films
1931 films
1930s American animated films
American black-and-white films